Hoseynabad (also Romanized as Ḩoseynābād) is a village in Garmsir Rural District, in the Central District of Ardestan County, Isfahan Province, Iran. At the 2006 census, its population was 317, in 92 families.

References 

Populated places in Ardestan County